South Carlton is a village and civil parish in the West Lindsey district of Lincolnshire, England. The population (including Broxholme) at the 2011 census was 168.

Church
South Carlton church is dedicated to Saint John the Baptist, and is a Grade I listed building dating from the 12th century with later alterations. After "various 18th and 19th century mutilations" it was almost entirely rebuilt in 1859, mostly by Samuel Sanders Teulon, and, according to Pevsner, presented "an unpromising exterior".

In the north chapel of the church, behind wrought iron railings, is the large alabaster and marble tomb of Sir John (d.1593) and Jane, Lady Monson (d.1625), dating from 1625, by Nicholas Stone. Their son was Sir Thomas Monson, who was an English politician.

A mausoleum for the Monson family was built in 1851 by Watkins, which contains a monument to the sixth Lord Monson (1796–1862) by Bartolini and Bencini.

Near the south porch in the graveyard, is a Grade II listed gravestone to William Sander who died in 1762, on which is inscribed the following:

"Remember, man, as you pass by,
As you are now so once was I,
As I am now so you must be,
Therefore prepair [sic] to follow me."

School
The Monson Free School was founded here in 1678 by Sir John Monson. The current school building dates from 1876, and a nearby stone marks the date of the original. It is now closed.

First World War airfield

  

South Carlton Airfield opened in November 1916 with the code XOSQ, and consisted of seven large canvas and brick hangars, and wooden living quarters and offices. In July 1918 it was designated No 46 Training Depot Station and equipped with AV 504, Camel and Dolphin aircraft. It closed in 1920.

References

External links

RAF Lincolnshire - South Carlton
Lincolnshire Churches - South Carlton

Villages in Lincolnshire
Civil parishes in Lincolnshire
West Lindsey District